The following is the list of Mexico's 32 federal states ranked by their GDP (PPP) per capita as of 2018, according to OECD Statistics.

See also
List of Mexican states by GDP
List of Mexican states by Human Development Index

General:
 States of Mexico
 Ranked list of Mexican states

References

GDP
GDP
Mexican states
Mexico, GDP per capita